The narrow-banded sand-swimmer or thick-tailed skink (Eremiascincus fasciolatus) is a species of skink found in Queensland in Australia.

References

Eremiascincus
Reptiles described in 1867
Taxa named by Albert Günther